Degenhart is a surname. Notable people with the surname include:

Elmar Degenhart (born 1959), German businessman
Enrique Antonio Degenhart Asturias, Guatemalan government minister
Ernesto José Degenhart (born 1966), Guatemalan swimmer

See also
Degenhardt